Bangladesh–Qatar relations refer to the bilateral relations between Bangladesh and Qatar. Both countries are members of the Organisation of Islamic Cooperation.

History 
Bangladesh has an embassy in Doha. The Bangladeshi ambassador is Jashim Uddin. Bangladesh and Qatar agreed to boost defense ties.  Qatar Charity has schools, orphanages and training centres in Bangladesh. In 2014 Women's Association of Bangladesh-Qatar was formed in Doha. Bangladeshs' foreign minister Abul Hassan Mahmud Ali visited Qatar in 2016 to discuss trade and bilateral ties.

Economic relations 

Bangladesh signed a deal in November 2013 to import LNG from Qatar with negotiations going back to 2010. Bangladesh exported goods worth 1.8 million dollar in 2013. Bangladeshi newspaper Prothom Alo started weekly publications of its paper in Qatar in October 2014, the first Bangladeshi daily to publish outside the country.  In June 2017, Bangladesh signed an agreement with Qatari company Qatargas to receive 2.5 million tonnes of LNG annually for the following 15 years. Shipments are due to begin in 2018.

In 2015 the largest group of migrant workers from Bangladesh went to Qatar. Approximately 123,000 Bangladeshi expatriates were working in Qatar in 2015, mainly in the construction sector.

References 

 
Qatar
Bilateral relations of Qatar